Mahesh Gawli (born 23 January 1980) is an Indian football coach and former footballer who played as a centre-back and represented India national football team on 68 occasions between 2000 and 2011.

Club career
Gawli was born in Goa and began playing football at 8. Gawli’s talent was immediately spotted by the coaches at all age groups. He was a member of the Goa U-12 team that lost against Japan U-12 in 1991–92. He then joined the famed Tata Football Academy.

Gawli started his career at FC Kochin where he joined in 1998 after graduating from Tata Football Academy and won the Kerala League with them before moving on to Churchill Brothers.

He stayed there at Churchill for three consecutive seasons from 2000–2002 and won the Goa Professional League thrice with them. He also helped them secure the Runners-up medals in the 2001–02 season of National Football League (India) before moving on to Kolkata biggies East Bengal.

Gawli first tasted the National League success in 2003–04 season after moving into the East Bengal. He was also a member of the East Bengal team that won the prestigious 2003 ASEAN Club Championship in where he also scored a goal against Philippine Army F.C. East Bengal completed a treble that season by winning the Kolkata League crown as well.

After a successful three-year stint with the East Bengal, it was time for Mahesh to find his place in Mahindra United team. It was under Mahindra Coach David Booth that Gawli displayed his finest brand of football. He helped Mahindra win the NFL, Indian Federation Cup, Mumbai Football League and the IFA Shield and was part of the team that participated in the 2007 AFC Cup and went on to reach the last eight stage. Gawli won the best defender award in the 10th NFL for his stellar performances in Mahindra United colors.

Then it was like a homecoming for Mahesh as he moved from Mahindra to Dempo S.C. in 2007 and has become a pillar of strength in Dempo’s defense. Gawli has won two I-League titles with Dempo and is a regular starter for the club and forms a formidable partnership with another India international Samir Naik. He helped Dempo reach the semi-finals of 2008 AFC Cup and the pre-quarters in 2011 AFC Cup.

International career
He represented India in the AFC U-16 Championship in 1996 held in Thailand and was included in the Asian All Star U-16 team. Gawli soon made his international debut in the pre-Olympic qualifier against Thailand in 1999 and cemented his place in the Indian team.

Mahesh has been representing India since 2001. With India, he won the LG Cup and several SAFF Cups. He was part of the historical Nehru Cup 2007 win in which he was the man of the match in the final against Syria. He was also an important part of the victorious India team at the  2008 AFC Challenge Cup.

He announced his retirement on 26 December 2011, almost 2 weeks after winning the 2011 SAFF Championship with India.

International statistics

International goals

Honours

East Bengal
National Football League (1): 2003-04
ASEAN Club Championship (1): 2003

Mahindra United
National Football League (1): 2005
Federation Cup (1): 2005
IFA Shield (1): 2006

Dempo S.C.
I-League (3): 2007-08 I-League, 2009-10 I-League, 2011-12 I-League
Super Cup (1): 2008

India
AFC Challenge Cup (1): 2008
SAFF Cup (2): 2005, 2011; runner-up: 2008
Nehru Cup (2): 2007, 2009
 South Asian Games Bronze medal: 1999

India U23
 LG Cup: 2002

Individual
Best defender of the I-league: 2004-05, 2005–06, 2006–07, 2007–08, 2011–12
2007 ONGC Nehru Cup Final: Man Of the Match
Dilip Sardesai Sports Excellence Award: 2008

References

External links

 

Living people
1980 births
Indian footballers
Footballers from Goa
India international footballers
India youth international footballers
FC Kochin players
Churchill Brothers FC Goa players
Dempo SC players
East Bengal Club players
2011 AFC Asian Cup players
I-League players
Mahindra United FC players
Association football central defenders
Footballers at the 2002 Asian Games
Asian Games competitors for India
South Asian Games medalists in football
South Asian Games bronze medalists for India